Antonio Curò (21 June 1828, Bergamo – 10 May 1906) was an Italian engineer, mountaineer and entomologist.

He was a lepidopterist and published Saggio di un Catalogo dei Lepidotteri d’Italia between 1875 and 1889.

He was a founder and president of the Bergamo section of the Italian Alpine Club.

His collection is conserved in the Museo di Scienze Naturali Enrico Caffi.

Italian entomologists
1828 births
1906 deaths
Scientists from Bergamo
Sportspeople from Bergamo